The 1993–94 Kazakhstan Hockey Championship was the second season of the Kazakhstan Hockey Championship, the top level of ice hockey in Kazakhstan. Five teams participated in the league, and Torpedo Ust-Kamenogorsk won the championship.

Standings

References
Kazakh Ice Hockey Federation

Kazakhstan Hockey Championship seasons
Kazakhstan Hockey Championship seasons
Kaz